The Pragser Wildsee, or Lake Prags, Lake Braies is a lake in the Prags Dolomites in South Tyrol, Italy. It belongs to the municipality of Prags which is located in the Prags Valley.

During World War II it was the destination of the transport of concentration camp inmates to Tyrol.

In recent years, the lake has earned the nickname "Pearl of the Alps" due to its increasing popularity among tourists.

Toponym 
The name of the lake is attested in 1296 as Hünz an den Se, in 1330 as Praxersee, in 1400 as See in Prags, in 1620 as Pragsersee and in 1885 as Pragser Wildsee; the appellation of wild is therefore nineteenth-century, and perhaps to be connected to mountaineering which in that period began to become a mass phenomenon. The Italian name "Lago di Braies" dates back to 1940, while in the first Handbook of 1923 it still appears only as "Pragser Wildsee".

Geography 
The lake lies at the foot of the imposing rock face of the Seekofel (Italian Croda del Becco, Ladin Sass dla Porta 2,810 m) and is located within the Fanes - Sennes - Prags nature park.

It has an extension of about 31 hectares with a length of 1.2 km and a width of 300-400 meters. It is one of the deepest lakes in the autonomous province of Bolzano, with a maximum depth of 36 meters and an average depth of 17. The maximum water temperature is 14 °C. It is a barrage lake, as its creation is due to the barrage of the Prags River due to a landslide detached from the Herrstein.

The lake is a tourist destination, which attracts visitors for the blue / emerald green color of its clear waters and for the natural scenery in which it is immersed. In fact, the lake is surrounded on three sides by Dolomite peaks, including the Seekofel. The lake is the starting point of the Alta via n. 1 of the Dolomites called "The classic" which reaches Belluno at the foot of the Schiara Group.

Tourism 
In recent years, thanks to popularity of the Italian TV series Un passo dal cielo, the Pragser Wildsee became one of the most visited places of the region Trentino-South Tyrol as it started attracting the attention of countless travel bloggers and professional photographers. The large inflow of tourism brought local administrators to think of ways to reduce the number of visits to preserve the mountain-lake ecosystem.

Visit the Lake 
To visit the lake, it must be approached from the north side.
To reach the lake, you need to reach the Prags Valley between the villages of Welsberg and Niederdorf in Puster Valley.

After traveling a few kilometers, you will come across the only crossroads and take the road towards the lake. After passing the villages of Schmieden and St. Veit, you arrive at the car park (to pay in the tourist season), where there is a large hotel-restaurant, the Hotel Pragser Wildsee linked to the pioneering figure of Emma Hellenstainer.

It is possible to take a tour around the banks of the lake. This route is  flat and wide on the west bank, while on the east bank it is steep and narrow, with some stairways. Despite this, the beautiful walk that leads to the foot of the Seekofel can be tackled by any hiker. During the winter period these paths (especially the one on the eastern shore) are often closed, due to the danger of avalanches. It is however possible to make an excursion around the lake, since its surface is solidly frozen.

Filmography 
In the summer of 2010, on the shores of Pragser Wildsee, the Italian television series "Un Passo dal Cielo" was shot, broadcast by Rai 1 since 2011, focusing on the life of Pietro (played by Terence Hill), a team commander of the Forestry Corps of the autonomous province of Bolzano from Innichen. In the summer of 2012, the second series of the fiction was shot, the third, the fourth and in 2018 the fifth season. On 28 December 2016, the second episode of the documentary series Speciali Storia - Hostages of the SS was broadcast on Rai Storia, which reconstructs with actors the story of April 1945 of the prisoners of the Pragser Wildsee.

Sport 
Since 2012, curling competitions have been held on the frozen surface of the lake during the winter season.

Gallery

References

Environment agency of South Tyrol 

Lakes of South Tyrol